The 1929 Tamworth by-election was held on 2 December 1929.  The by-election was held due to the resignation of the incumbent Conservative MP, Sir Edward Iliffe.  It was won by the Conservative candidate Arthur Steel-Maitland.

Background

Sir Edward Iliffe had been MP for Tamworth since 1923. In the general elections of both 1923 and 1924 Iliffe had been returned unopposed. In the general election a few months earlier he had been challenged by Labour candidate George Horwill, but had been easily re-elected, with Horwill polling only 14,402 votes against Iliffe's total of 29,807.

Horwill, an ex-railway clerk who held a BSc degree from the University of London, was again the Labour candidate in the by-election. The new Conservative candidate was Arthur Steel-Maitland, a former cabinet minister who had been a member of parliament from 1910, but who had lost narrowly lost his Birmingham Erdington seat at the recent general election.

Result

Aftermath

At the next election Steel-Maitland substantially increased his majority to over 34,000 votes.

References

Tamworth by-election
Tamworth by-election
Tamworth by-election
By-elections to the Parliament of the United Kingdom in Staffordshire constituencies
20th century in Staffordshire
Politics of Tamworth, Staffordshire